Dávid Wittrédi (born 17 June 1987, in Pécs) is a Hungarian football player who plays for Pécsváradi Spartacus.

References

External links
Profile at HLSZ

1987 births
Living people
Sportspeople from Pécs
Hungarian footballers
Association football forwards
Pécsi MFC players
Kozármisleny SE footballers
Debreceni VSC players
Zalaegerszegi TE players
Nemzeti Bajnokság I players
Nemzeti Bajnokság II players
21st-century Hungarian people